Elliot Goldenthal scored the soundtrack Demolition Man: The Original Orchestral Score for the movie Demolition Man. It is an example of his off-beat style and use of unconventional techniques in film score, incorporating big brass clashes and complex, dramatic string arrangements.

It won Goldenthal an ASCAP award in 1994 for best original score and was his first big budget action film score.

Track listing 
 "Dies Irae" – 1:51
 "Fire Fight" – 1:35
 "Guilty as Charged" – 3:58
 "Action, Guns, Fun" – 1:26
 "Machine Waltz" – 1:56
 "Defrosting" – 1:43
 "Confronting the Chief" – 0:32
 "Museum Dis Duel" – 1:56
 "Subterranean Slugfest" – 1:44
 "Meeting Coctaeu" – 1:42
 "Tracking Simon Phoenix" – 3:03
 "Obligatory Car Chase" – 3:06
 "Flawless Pearl" – 1:15
 "Final Confrontation" – 1:55
 "Code 187" – 0:41
 "Silver Screen Kiss" – 1:30

Crew/Credit 
 Music Composed by Elliot Goldenthal
 Music Produced by Matthias Gohl
 Orchestrated by Elliot Goldenthal and Robert Elhai
 Conducted by Jonathan Sheffer / Additional: Artie Kane
 Recorded by Steve McLaughlin and Bobby Fernandez
 Mixed by Steve McLaughlin and Joel Iwataki
 Additional Orchestrations by David John Olsen and Lolita Ritmanis

References

External links 
 A page for the score on Goldenthal's website
 Varèse Sarabande page for the score

Film scores
Science fiction soundtracks
1993 soundtrack albums
Elliot Goldenthal soundtracks
Science fiction film soundtracks
Action film soundtracks